The Men's 50 Breaststroke event at the 10th FINA World Aquatics Championships swam July 22 – 23, 2003 in Barcelona, Spain. Preliminary and Semifinal heats were on 22 July, with Prelims swum in the morning session and Semifinals in the evening session. The Final swam in the evening session on 25 July.

At the start of the event, the existing World (WR) and Championship (CR) records were:
WR: 27.18 swum by Oleg Lisogor (Ukraine) on August 2, 2002 in Berlin, Germany
CR: 27.52 swum by Oleg Lisogor (Ukraine) on July 29, 2001 in Fukuoka, Japan

Results

Final

Semifinals

Preliminaries

Notes:
Filina: Natalya Filina was mis-entered in the men's event, rather than the women's event.

References

Swimming at the 2003 World Aquatics Championships